The 1959 FIBA World Championship for Women (Russian: Чемпионат мира по баскетболу среди женщин 1959) was the third FIBA World Championship for Women basketball championship held by FIBA. It was held in the Soviet Union between 10 October and 18 October 1959. Eight national teams entered the event under the auspices of FIBA, the sport's governing body. The city of Moscow hosted the tournament. The Soviet Union won its first title after finishing in first place in round-robin group. The United States were the defending champions, but did not participate in the tournament.

Squads

Soviet Union
 3	Nina MAKSIMELIANOVA 		 	 
 4	Skaidrite SMILDZINIA-BUDOVSKA	 		 	 
 5	Valentina KOSTIKOVA	 	 
 6	Maret-Mai Otsa	 	 
 7	Nina POZNANSKAYA	 
 8	Raisa KUZNETSOVA-MIKHAILOVA 		 	 
 9	Ene Kitsing 	 	 
 10	Jurate DOKTORAITE	 
 11	Nina ARCISEVSKAYA
 12	Nina EREMINA
 13	Galina JAROSEVSKAYA	 
 14	Helena BITNERE

Results
The tournament consisted of a single round-robin group. Every team played each other once and the top team in the group was declared champion.

|}

Awards

References

Results 
FIBA Archive

FIBA Women's Basketball World Cup
International basketball competitions hosted by the Soviet Union
World Championship for Women
FIBA World Championship for Women
FIBA World Championship for Women
Women's basketball in the Soviet Union